Betnijah Laney (born October 29, 1993) is an American professional basketball player for the New York Liberty of the Women's National Basketball Association (WNBA). She played college basketball for Rutgers University.

Early life
Laney started playing basketball at 10 years old, largely thanks to her mother having played basketball competitively. Her best friends are Aiyannah Peal and Sydni Epps.

High school and college career
Laney attended Smyrna High School in Smyrna, Delaware where she averaged 23.7 points, 10 rebounds, 4.4 steals, 4.3 assists and 1.2 blocks per game as a senior and was named a McDonald's All-American.

In her four-year career at Rutgers, Laney played 129 games with 107 starts, and averaged 10.9 points, 7.1 rebounds, 2.2 assists and 1.2 steals per game.

College statistics

Source: Yahoo! Sports

Professional career

On April 16, 2015, Laney was selected by the Chicago Sky with the 17th overall pick in the 2015 WNBA draft. In her rookie season playing for the Sky, Laney averaged 2.8 points and 2.1 rebounds in 33 games (32 regular season and one playoff).

On July 16, 2015, Laney signed with the Perth Lynx for the 2015–16 WNBL season. On November 11, 2015, she was named in the WNBL's Team of the Week for Round 5 after recording 12 points, 11 rebounds and 6 assists against the Adelaide Lightning on November 8. On January 13, 2016, she earned Team of the Week honors for a second time. On February 16, she was named WNBL Player of the Month for January. She led the Lynx to a second place regular season finish with a 16–8 win–loss record, and went on to score a game-high 23 points in the team's semi-final win over the first-seeded Townsville Fire. With the win, the Lynx advanced to the WNBL grand final for the first time since 1999. There they were outclassed by the defending champion Townsville (who made it to the grand final via the preliminary final), losing the best-of-three series 2–0. Laney appeared in all 27 games for the Lynx in 2015–16, averaging 15.2 points, 7.8 rebounds, 3.7 assists and 1.0 steals per game.

Laney returned to the Chicago Sky for the 2016 WNBA season. On June 8, she was ruled out for the rest of the season after tearing her left anterior cruciate ligament (ACL). The injury occurred during the second quarter of the Sky's June 3 game against the Washington Mystics.

On February 7, 2018, Laney signed a training camp deal with the Connecticut Sun.

Laney had a breakout season in 2020 with the Atlanta Dream; she was named to the WNBA All-Defensive Team and won the Most Improved Player Award. In 2021 she signed with the New York Liberty.

WNBA career statistics

Regular season

|-
| style="text-align:left;"| 2015
| style="text-align:left;"| Chicago
| 32 || 2 || 12.8 || .394 || .000 || .696 || 2.1 || 0.6 || 0.5 || 0.2 || 0.6 || 2.9
|-
| style="text-align:left;"| 2016
| style="text-align:left;"| Chicago
| 8 || 1 || 5.3 || .167 || .000 || 1.000 || 0.6 || 0.1 || 0.1 || 0.0 || 0.3 || 1.0
|-
| style="text-align:left;"| 2018
| style="text-align:left;"| Connecticut
| 29 || 0 || 9.3 || .471 || .111 || .909 || 1.7 || 0.7 || 0.4 || 0.0 || 0.6 || 2.7
|-
| style='text-align:left;'|2019
| style='text-align:left;'|Indiana
| 34 || 27 || 25.8 || .362 || .303 || .581 || 4.2 || 1.7 || 1.4 || 0.1 || 1.4 || 5.6
|-
| style='text-align:left;'|2020
| style='text-align:left;'|Atlanta
| 22 || 22 || 33.5 || .481 || .405 || .827 || 4.9 || 4.0 || 1.6 || 0.1 || 3.0 || 17.2
|-
| style='text-align:left;'|2021
| style='text-align:left;'|New York
| 32 || 32 || 33.4 || .451 || .312 || .787 || 4.1 || 5.2 || 0.7 || 0.1 || 3.7 || 16.8
|-
| style='text-align:left;'|2022
| style='text-align:left;'|New York
| 9 || 6 || 28.3 || .422 || .379 || .875 || 3.3 || 2.8 || 0.4 || 0.1 || 2.7 || 11.2
|-
| style='text-align:left;'| Career
| style='text-align:left;'| 7 years, 5 teams
| 166 || 90 || 22.1 || .435 || .327 || .780 || 3.2 || 2.3 || 0.8 || 0.1 || 1.8 || 8.3

Playoffs

|-
| style="text-align:left;"| 2015
| style="text-align:left;"| Chicago
| 1 || 0 || 2.0 || .000 || .000 || .000 || 0.0 || 0.0 || 0.0 || 0.0 || 1.0 || 0.0
|-
| style='text-align:left;'|2021
| style='text-align:left;'|New York
| 1 || 1 || 37.0 || .455 || .429 || .667 || 4.0 || 3.0 || 1.0 || 0.0 || 2.0 || 25.0
|-
| style='text-align:left;'|2022
| style='text-align:left;'|New York
| 3 || 3 || 24.3 || .419 || .250 || .875 || 4.0 || 3.3 || 0.7 || 0.3 || 2.3 || 11.3
|-
| align="left" | Career
| align="left" | 3 years, 2 teams
| 5 || 4 || 22.4 || .434 || .364 || .818 || 3.2 || 2.6 || 0.6 || 0.2 || 2.0 || 11.8
|}

Personal
Betnijah Laney is the daughter of Yolanda Laney, who played for Cheyney State and was also coached by C. Vivian Stringer.

References

External links
WNBA profile
Rutgers bio
Basketball-Reference.com profile

1993 births
Living people
American expatriate basketball people in Australia
American expatriate basketball people in Israel
American women's basketball players
Atlanta Dream players
Basketball players from Delaware
Chicago Sky draft picks
Chicago Sky players
Connecticut Sun players
Indiana Fever players
McDonald's High School All-Americans
New York Liberty players
Parade High School All-Americans (girls' basketball)
People from Clayton, Delaware
Perth Lynx players
Rutgers Scarlet Knights women's basketball players
Shooting guards
Small forwards
Women's National Basketball Association All-Stars